Monster in the Closet is a 1986 horror comedy with a veteran cast, including Howard Duff and John Carradine, as well as Stacy Ferguson and Paul Walker in early roles. The film was distributed by Troma Entertainment. In the GotchaMovies article "Final Destinations and Killer Condoms", Monster in the Closet was selected as the 8th greatest moment in teen slasher history. The film was directed and written by Bob Dahlin.

After a series of murders in San Francisco that all take place inside closets, a reporter and his scientist friend decide to uncover the mystery and save California. The killer is revealed as a monster in the closet and is responsible for the gruesome attacks.

Plot
In the small town of Chesnut, California, strange and gruesome murders have taken place. A College girl, named Meredith Caldwell is attacked by a mysterious creature, after she faints the creature drags her into a closet and kills her. Sometime later the creature attacks a blind man named Joe Shempter in his closet after it killed his seeing-eye dog and hung it on the closet door. Even more time later the creature attacks a little girl named Lucy in her parent's closet while playing hide and seek.

In San Francisco, California, a reporter named Richard Clark is down on his luck looking for a good story for his over-demanding boss. Especially since he's always outshined by the most successful and egotistical reporter Scoop. When Richard asks for a story to work on for his boss, Scoop finds a newspaper article in the trash about the mysterious murders in Chestnut and gives it to Richard claiming it's one of his stories. When Richard arrives at the police station in Chestnut he meets Diane Bennett the physics professor of the town college and her brilliant son who she calls "The Professor." Although the Professor likes Richard, Diane strongly dislikes him for giving him chocolate. After Richard talks to the sheriff, Sam Ketchem about the murders, he reveals that all the dead bodies had two huge holes in them and also says that Diane thinks it's a snake, but he thinks its just some psychopath. They then leave to investigate the first murder site at the college.

Meanwhile, close by the college, a woman named Margo is taking a shower when her husband, Roy asks her for the keys to her car so he can go to work. She tells him that they are in her purse in the closet but after he gets them he is pulled back into the closet by the creature who attacks him. Margo sees the whole thing and rushes outside to the college for help, after Richard and Sam go to her room they find the creature gone, Roy's dead body on the floor, and a strange-looking claw. They bring it to Diane and her coworker Dr. Pennyworth and Richard is invited for dinner at Diane's house where he meets Father Finnegan of the church. Suddenly they hear a scream outside by one of the neighbors who claim the creature is in their house. When Sherriff Sam has his men surround the area and orders the person inside to come out. It's revealed that the creature killing people is a huge brown monster with a giant mouth. Sam thinking that the monster is a guy in a costume tries to shoot it but it has no effect on it. Then it picks him up, attacks him with its tongue which also has its own head and teeth, and kills him.

The next day the town of Chestnut is in a panic as the U.S. army arrives to deal with the monster. At Diane's house, Dr. Pennyworth discovers a lyrical pattern to communicate with the monster thanks to a recording of its roars by the Professor. While eating together Diane becomes smitten by Richard Clark after he removes his glasses, but comes back to her sense when he puts them back on. Just then they are all called to see the army which has discovered the monster's pattern and its next target would be the elementary school the Professor is at. They all rush to the school to try and save him but by the time they arrive, the monster is there. It grabs the professor and tries to drag him into a closet but Richard saves him by using the monster's claw to cut his shirt from its arm. They rush outside and when Dr. Pennyworth tries to communicate with the monster using a xylophone it attacks and kills him. The army attacks with full power but it has no effect on the monster and it escapes. With his last bit of breath, Dr. Pennyworth tells them that in order to stop the monster they have to destroy all of something.

The next day the town of Chestnut is evacuated with the general of the army completely giving up on stopping the monster. After Diane, Clark, the Professor, and Father Finnegan have a funeral for Dr. Pennyworth, Diane gets an idea to stop the monster by building a device to destroy its energy. Clark and Diane then take some stuff around town and at night they use the monster's lyrical pattern to draw it to their house and trap it. They believe the monster will come in through the front door but it actually comes in through the closet behind them. They try using the machine to destroy its energy but it doesn't work. The monster then chases them up the stairs where the Professor tries to attack it with a laser but it also doesn't work. Just when it's about to attack, Richard's glasses fall off and it becomes smitten by him. It then picks up Richard unconscious and carries him out of the house, just when Diane believes there's no hope the Professor gets an idea. Instead of destroying all its energy they should destroy all closets.

On the news, the people of San Francisco are in a panic as they run from the monster who is marching toward the town. Diane then reports all over the world that in order to stop the monster they have to destroy all closets. All over the world people start chopping, burning, and ripping apart their closets, which causes the monster to get weak since there isn't one for it to go into. Just then it walks right to the Transamerica building and finds a janitor's closet but it's too small for both the monster and Richard to go into. So the monster walks out of the building into the middle of the street, where it collapses and dies. Diane reunites with Richard and kisses him, as the world celebrates the death of the monster.

Cast
Donald Grant as Richard Clark
Denise DuBarry as Professor Diane Bennett
Paul Walker as "Professor" Bennett
Stella Stevens as Margo
Kevin Peter Hall as Monster
Claude Akins as Sheriff Sam Ketchem
Howard Duff as Father Finnegan
Henry Gibson as Dr. Pennyworth
Donald Moffat as General Franklin D. Turnbull
Paul Dooley as Roy
John Carradine as Old Joe Shempter
Jesse White as Ben
Frank Ashmore as Scoop
Stacy Ferguson as Lucy
Clare Torao as Television Newscaster (credited as Clare Nono)

Release

Home media
Monster in the Closet was released on VHS by Troma Team Video in 1995. It was released for the first time on DVD by Troma on November 10, 1998. It was last released by Hollywood DVD on December 18, 2003.

References

External links

 Monster in the Closet – at the Troma Entertainment movie database

1986 films
1986 horror films
1980s comedy horror films
American comedy horror films
American independent films
American monster movies
1980s monster movies
Troma Entertainment films
Films set in San Francisco
American exploitation films
1986 comedy films
1980s English-language films
1980s American films